Bara massacre was a caste based carnage that took place in 1992 in Bihar. At midnight on 12–13 February 1992, the Maoist Communist Centre of India (now the Communist Party of India (Maoist)) killed 40 Bhumihars at Bara Village in Gaya district of Bihar, India. The MCC's armed group brought the 35 men of Bara village to the bank of a nearby canal, tied their hands and slit their throats.  As many as 36 people were accused of the crime, but charges were framed against only 13. The police failed to arrest the others, who had defied their summons.

Trigger
The massacre which targeted primarily upper caste Bhumihars, was  thought to be a deleterious consequence of the social justice politics in the Bihar of 1990s unleashed by Lalu Prasad Yadav. According to an India Today report, the Yadav leaders were openly preaching vendetta against the Bhumihars after the "Barsingha massacre" in which ten Dalits were killed by "Swarna Liberation Front", a caste army of Bhumihar landlords. The Congress leaders claimed that the MCC, though composed primarily of Dalits, has linkages to Janata Dal and Yadavs. According to a report of Indian Express:-

The upper caste killed 58 Dalits in "Laxmanpur Bathe" in response to the attack.

Trial and aftermath
After a prolonged trial, nine people were convicted by the Court of District and Sessions Judge, Gaya, Jawaharlal Chaudhary, in its judgment and order dated 8 June 2001. The court handed down death sentences to Nanhe Lal Mochi, Krishna Mochi, Bir Kuer Paswan and Dharmendra Singh, life sentences to Bihari Manjhi, Ramavtar Dussadh, Rajendra Paswan and Vakil Yadav, and imprisonment to Rabindra Singh. The Supreme Court confirmed the death sentences on 15 April 2002.

In further trials Gaya District and Sessions Judge Daroga Prasad designated the special TADA judge, pronounced Vyas Kahar, Naresh Paswan and Yugal Mochi of the Maoist Communist Centre (MCC) guilty of involvement and were to death.  The court acquitted Tyagi Mahto, Vijay Yadav and Madhusudan Sharma, on the grounds that the prosecution had failed to prove the charges beyond a reasonable doubt. The death sentence of the four convicts, Krishna Mochi, Nanhe Lal Mochi, Bir Kuer Paswan and Dharmendra Singh, was later commuted by President Pranab Mukherjee on 1 January 2017, as the result of a mercy petition.

See also
Dalelchak-Bhagaura Massacre 1987
Laxmanpur Bathe massacre
Afsar massacre

References

1992 murders in India
Massacres in 1992
February 1992 events in Asia
February 1992 crimes
Massacres in India
Massacres of men
Anti-Brahminism
1990s in Bihar
Crime in Bihar
Caste-related violence in Bihar
Violence against men in Asia